Washington, Pennsylvania is a city and the county seat of Washington County

Washington, Pennsylvania may also refer to:
 Washington Boro, Pennsylvania, an unincorporated community in Lancaster County
 Washington Crossing, Pennsylvania, an unincorporated village in Bucks County
 Washington Township, Pennsylvania, numerous communities in various counties

See also
 Washington (disambiguation)